Sharafabad (also Romanized as Sharafābād; also known as Pā’īn Sharafābād) is a village in Mazkureh Rural District, in the Central District of Sari County, Mazandaran Province, Iran. At the 2006 census, its population was 2,843, in 764 families.

References 

Populated places in Sari County